The 2014–15 Italian Rugby Union Championship was the 85th season of the Italian Rugby Union Championship. Rugby Calvisano successfully defended the title after once again beating Femi-CZ Rovigo in the playoff final. This time, pipping them 11 - 10.

Table

Results

Matchday 1

Matchday 2

Matchday 3

Matchday 4

Matchday 5

Matchday 6

Matchday 7

Matchday 8

Matchday 9

Matchday 10

Matchday 11

Matchday 12

Matchday 13

Matchday 14

Matchday 15

Matchday 16

Matchday 17

Matchday 18

2014-15
 
Italy